Costakis Koutsokoumnis (5 May 1956 – 5 March 2018) was a Cypriot football administrator, and a member of the FIFA Council since 2017.

Koutsokoumnis was president of the Cyprus Football Association from 2001 until his death in 2018.

In May 2017, he was elected to the FIFA Council, and was expected to serve until 2019. Koutsokoumnis died from cancer on 5 March 2018.

References

1956 births
2018 deaths
FIFA officials
People from Kyrenia
Cypriot people in sports
Deaths from cancer in Cyprus